The 1931 Eastern Suburbs season was the 24th in the club's history. They competed in the New South Wales Rugby Football League's 1931 season.

Ladder

Highlights

 Minor premiership
 Runners Up
 Jack Lynch was the leading Point and Try scorer in the New South Wales Rugby League competition.
 Club Championship
 3rd grade title

References

Rugby League Tables and Statistics

Sydney Roosters seasons
East